In Greek mythology, Areto ( "virtuous") was an Amazon.

Her name is not attested in literary sources, and is known solely from an Attic black-figure vase painting.

References
Realencyclopädie der Classischen Altertumswissenschaft. Band II, Halbband 3, Apollon-Artemis (1895): s. 681, s. v. Areto (in German)
Blok, Josine H. The early Amazons: modern and ancient perspectives on a persistent myth. BRILL, 1995; page 218 (with a reference to Lexicon Iconographicum Mythologiae Classicae, "Amazones" entry, vol. 1, p. 653)

Amazons (Greek mythology)